Esashi is the name of two towns in Hokkaidō.
Esashi, Hokkaidō (Sōya) (枝幸町) in Sōya Subprefecture 
 Esashi, Hokkaidō (Hiyama) (江差町) in Hiyama Subprefecture